Saborna crkva (Cyrillic: Саборна црква) means 'Orthodox cathedral' in Serbian. It may refer to the following cathedrals:

 St. Michael's Cathedral (Belgrade)
 Saint George's Cathedral (Novi Sad)
 Holy Trinity Cathedral (Niš)
 Serb Orthodox Cathedral (Sarajevo)
  Cathedral of Christ the Saviour (Banja Luka)
 Cathedral of the Holy Trinity (Mostar)